The Garfield House is a historic two-story house in South Pasadena, California. It was built in 1904 for First Lady Lucretia Garfield, the widow of James A. Garfield who served as the 20th President of the United States in 1881. It was designed by Greene & Greene in the American Craftsman style. It has been listed on the National Register of Historic Places since April 24, 1973.

References

	
National Register of Historic Places in Los Angeles County, California
Bungalow architecture in California
Houses completed in 1904
1904 establishments in California
James A. Garfield